The Suzano school shooting, also known as the Suzano massacre, was a school shooting that took place on March 13, 2019, at the Professor Raul Brasil State School in the Brazilian municipality of Suzano, São Paulo State. The perpetrators, 17-year-old Guilherme Taucci Monteiro and 25-year-old Luiz Henrique de Castro, both former students at the school, killed five students and two school employees. Before the attack, in a car shop near the school, the pair also killed Monteiro's uncle. After the shooting, Monteiro killed his partner and then committed suicide.

The attack was the second major school shooting in Brazil, after the Realengo massacre in 2011.

Attack 
Earlier in the day, the gunmen shot three times and killed Monteiro's uncle, Jorge Antônio Moraes, in a nearby car shop. The two attackers drove to the school in a white Chevrolet Onix that Castro had legally rented at Localiza.

School cameras recorded the attackers entering the school at around 9:40 a.m. local time, one after the other, with a delay of around 10 seconds. Monteiro entered the building first, hiding his face from students while retrieving a hidden gun. He disappeared from camera and then moved on to the institution's linguistics center.

By this time, Castro appeared on camera entering the building in a hurry while holding several weapons, including a bow which he eventually left on the floor. He approached the corpses lying on the ground and struck them with a hatchet. Fleeing students started to run from the patio towards the school entrance hall. On the way, they encountered Castro, who was still in the entrance hall. Other students who had hidden themselves when they first heard gunshots were able to avoid being shot. Five students between 15 and 17 years old and two school staff members were killed.

The school was locked down by police, who searched it and found a bow and arrow, a crossbow, possible Molotov cocktails and a wired bag. A bomb squad was dispatched to the scene and found that it was a fake explosive.

Perpetrators
The shooters were Guilherme Taucci Monteiro (July 5, 2001 – March 13, 2019) and Luiz Henrique de Castro (March 16, 1993 – March 13, 2019). Monteiro lived with his grandparents as his mother had addiction problems. Both attackers had attended the targeted school. Monteiro allegedly dropped out due to having been bullied the previous year. The attackers had been close friends since childhood.

They had planned the attack for a year and, inspired by the Columbine High School massacre, they hoped the attack would draw more attention than the Columbine massacre. According to some reports, both perpetrators were influenced by Dogolachan, a far-right imageboard known for inciting terrorism and violence where they had been asking for weapons and support. On this imageboard Luiz was known as luhkrcher666 and Guilherme as 1guY-55chaN. In a statement from Monteiro's mother, Monteiro had reportedly been bullied because of his acne. She also stated that he had been harassed by a fellow pupil. A third suspect, not directly involved in the attack, stated that the perpetrators also intended to carry out rapes. The perpetrators might have been influenced by Elephant, a movie about a school shooting in which a murder-suicide between the shooters ends the movie.

Victims
Two victims were school staff members. The first victim to be shot was Marilena Ferreira Vieira Umezu, a pedagogical coordinator. Five high school students were killed, four of whom died at the site and one en route to a hospital. The attack also left eleven students wounded who were taken to nearby hospitals. Two of these victims, who presented a more serious clinical condition, were transferred to Hospital das Clínicas in São Paulo.

Deaths
Students
 Caio Oliveira, 15
 Claiton Antônio Ribeiro, 17
 Douglas Murilo Celestino, 16
 Kaio Lucas da Costa Limeira, 15
 Samuel Melquíades Silva de Oliveira, 16
 
School staff
 Marilena Ferreira Vieira Umezu, 59
 Eliana Regina de Oliveira Xavier, 38
 
Perpetrator's relatives
 Jorge Antônio Moraes, 51, uncle of Guilherme Taucci Monteiro

Reaction 
Many authorities, politicians, artists and other people expressed their condolences and commented on the tragedy.

João Doria, governor of São Paulo, canceled his routine activities and flew to Suzano in a helicopter along with Rossieli Soares, the state's Secretary of Education; Colonel Salles, military police commander; and army general João Camilo Pires de Campos. Doria lamented the attack and decreed 3 days of mourning in the state.

President Jair Bolsonaro lamented the tragedy and expressed his condolences to the victims' families on a tweet posted 6 hours after the tragedy. Ricardo Vélez Rodríguez, Minister of Education, expressed solidarity: "My condolences to the families. I express my contempt towards that demonstration of violence. I'll be closely following the investigation". Onyx Lorenzoni, Chief of Staff, also tweeted his condolences. Damares Alves, Minister of Women, Family and Human Rights, lamented the event and offered support by the Ministry.

Rodrigo Maia, President of the Chamber of Deputies, expressed his solidarity towards the families of victims and said that "it's time for Brazil to unite forces and competences to understand what happened and prevent new massacres like that one from occurring". Davi Alcolumbre, President of the Senate, expressed his condolences and tweeted: "I hope that the real causes behind that tragedy be discovered". As a result of the shooting, many congress members brought the question of gun control back into debate, with some criticizing the relaxation of gun laws.

São Paulo's federal congressman Júnior Bozella wanted to create a bill as a reaction to the tragedy, justifying that violent video games can lead the youth to commit "massive acts of violence". Júnior's proposal was criticized by several sectors, who considered as a "censorship setback" that could bring economic problems to Brazil.

Dias Toffoli, President of the Supreme Federal Court, read a note during an ordinary plenary section on March 13 in which he expressed his solidarity towards the families and friends of the victims and to society as a whole, which "is also a victim of that kind of tragedy". He also stated: "we can't let hatred enter our society".

The tragedy was followed by Brazilian media and attracted attention of international media including BBC News, Le Figaro, Focus, El País and The Guardian.

See also 
2019 in Brazil
List of attacks related to secondary schools
List of school massacres by death toll

References

2019 murders in Brazil
Filmed killings
Mass murder in Brazil
Mass shootings in Brazil
Murder–suicides in Brazil
School shootings committed by pupils
School shootings in Brazil
 Criminal duos
2019 mass shootings in South America
March 2019 crimes in South America
Mass murder in 2019
2019 suicides
Incidents of violence against boys
Violence against women in Brazil
Murder in Brazil
Attacks in South America in 2019
Columbine High School massacre copycat crimes